The Siamese mud carp (Henicorhynchus siamensis) is a species of freshwater cyprinid fish, a variety of Asian carp native to the Mekong and Chao Phraya Rivers in Southeast Asia, especially in Cambodia, Laos and Thailand.  It is very common in floodplains during the wet season and migrates upstream in the Mekong starting in Cambodia.

The Siamese mud carp has commercial use locally, both as food and in the aquarium trade.

Local names:
 Thai: pla soi khao
 Laotian: ປາຊວຍ 
 Khmer: trey riel tob
 Vietnamese: Cá linh thùy .

References

Carp
Fish of the Mekong Basin
Fish of Cambodia
Fish of Laos
Fish of Thailand
Fish of Vietnam
Fish described in 1881
Henicorhynchus